Vagellia is a monotypic genus of Southeast Asian araneomorph spiders in the family Cybaeidae containing the single species, Vagellia helveola. It was first described by Eugène Simon in 1899, and has only been found in Indonesia.

References

Cybaeidae
Monotypic Araneomorphae genera
Spiders of Asia
Taxa named by Eugène Simon